Sainte-Anne-de-la-Pérade is a municipality in the Les Chenaux Regional County Municipality, in the Mauricie region of the province of Quebec in Canada. The town is located near the mouth of the Sainte-Anne River along the Chemin du Roy, a historic segment of Quebec Route 138 that stretches from near Montreal to Quebec City.

It is the world capital of Tommy Cod fishing. During Tommy Cod season, generally from late December to mid-February, thousands of tourists come to Sainte-Anne for ice fishing and a small fishing village is built on the frozen waters of the Sainte-Anne River that bisects the town.

The centrepiece of the town is the Sainte-Anne-de-la-Pérade Church, a Catholic church near the banks of the Sainte-Anne River, modelled after the Notre-Dame Basilica in Montreal.

History
On October 29, 1672, an area of 1.5 lieue (about 4.8 km) by 1 lieue (about 3.2 km) deep at the Sainte-Anne River was granted by Intendant Jean Talon as a seignory to Edmond de Suève and Thomas Tarieu de Lanouguère (or Lanaudière). An increase of 3 lieues was granted to Marguerite Denis, widow of Thomas Tarieu, by Governor Frontenac and Intendant Champigny on March 4, 1697. The islands were added to the seignory on April 6, 1697, and confirmed on October 30, 1700. The order of January 8, 1710, dismissed the co-seigneur François Chorel de Saint-Romain d'Orvilliers and granted the islands to Pierre-Thomas Tarieu de la Pérade, son of Thomas Tarieu and husband of Madeleine de Verchères, a Quebec heroine who, at 14 years of age, successfully defended her parents' fort against a band of Iroquois. Following another increase granted in April 1735 to Pierre-Thomas Tarieu, the Sainte-Anne-De La Pérade Seignory came to be named after him.

In 1693, the Parish of Sainte-Anne-de-la-Pérade was formed. In 1820, the post office opened. In 1845, the parish municipality was established, abolished two years later during provincewide municipal restructuring, and reestablished in 1855. In 1912, the village itself separated from the parish municipality and was incorporated as the Village Municipality of La Pérade.

In May 1989, the village and parish municipalities merged again to form the new Municipality of Sainte-Anne-de-la-Pérade. On December 31, 2001, it was transferred from the Francheville Regional County to the new Les Chenaux Regional County, following the creation of the new City of Trois-Rivières and the dissolution of the Francheville RCM.

Demographics
Population trend:
 Population in 2011: 2072 (2006 to 2011 population change: 4.1%)
 Population in 2006: 1991
 Population in 2001: 2151
 Population in 1996: 2181
 Population in 1991: 2213

Private dwellings occupied by usual residents: 954 (total dwellings: 1019)

Mother tongue:
 English as first language: 0.5%
 French as first language: 99.5%
 English and French as first language: 0%
 Other as first language: 0%

Notable natives
Joe Bryere
François-Xavier-Anselme Trudel

See also

 Charest River
 Sainte-Anne River
 Saint-Anne Seignorial Estate

References

Further reading
 Répertoire des mariages – Sainte-Anne-de-la-Pérade 1684-1900, written by Dominique Campagna, 162 pages

External links

 Municipalité de Sainte-Anne-de-la-Pérade 

Incorporated places in Mauricie
Municipalities in Quebec
Les Chenaux Regional County Municipality